Tino Ellis (born October 15, 1997) is an American football cornerback for the Miami Dolphins of the National Football League (NFL). After playing college football at Maryland, he signed with the New Orleans Saints as an undrafted free agent in 2020.

Early years 
Ellis attended DeMatha Catholic High School in Hyattsville, Maryland where he was a 4 star recruit, 2016 Under Armour All-American, and lead his school to three straight WCAC Championships. At DeMatha he was teammates of defensive end Chase Young and running back Anthony Mcfarland Jr. who were both selected in the 2020 NFL Draft. He committed to University of Maryland to play college football.

Professional career

New Orleans Saints 
Ellis signed with the New Orleans Saints as an undrafted free agent following the 2020 NFL Draft on April 25, 2020. He was waived from injured reserve on August 19, 2020.

Miami Dolphins 
Ellis signed with the Miami Dolphins on October 15, 2020. On August 31, 2021, Ellis was waived by the Dolphins and re-signed to the practice squad the next day. Ellis was waived on September 6, 2021.

Michigan Panthers (USFL)
Ellis was selected in the 8th round of the 2022 USFL Draft by the Michigan Panthers.

Miami Dolphins (second stint)
On July 27, 2022, Ellis signed with the Miami Dolphins. He was waived/injured on August 16 and placed on injured reserve. He was released on August 24. He was re-signed to the practice squad on October 10, 2022. He signed a reserve/future contract on January 16, 2023.

References

External links 
 Maryland Terrapin bio

1997 births
Living people
Players of American football from Maryland
American football cornerbacks
Maryland Terrapins football players
New Orleans Saints players
Miami Dolphins players
Michigan Panthers (2022) players